Masonboro Island is a barrier island in New Hanover County, North Carolina, United States. The island, which is undeveloped and accessible only by boat, is a component of the North Carolina National Estuarine Research Reserve and a North Carolina State Natural Area. It lies south of Wrightsville Beach, separated by Masonboro Inlet, and north of Carolina Beach, separated by Carolina Beach Inlet. The island is a destination for boating, surfing, and camping.

Masonboro Island is a mix of marshes, dunes and tidal flats, with beaches along its Atlantic coastline and a chain of small hills and wetland islands along Masonboro Sound, which is part of the Intracoastal Waterway. The beaches are a nesting ground for loggerheads and green sea turtles, and the waters on the sound side of the island are a nursery for spot, mullet, flounder and pompano.

References

Barrier islands of North Carolina
Protected areas of New Hanover County, North Carolina
Masonboro Island State Natural Area
Landforms of New Hanover County, North Carolina
Wetlands of North Carolina